The Women's 1500m Freestyle event at the 10th FINA World Aquatics Championships swam on 21–22 July 2003 in Barcelona, Spain. Preliminary heats swam during the morning session on July 21, with the top-8 finishers advancing to swim again in the event's Final during the evening session on July 22.

At the start of the event, the World (WR) and Championship (CR) records were:
WR: 15:52.10 swum by Janet Evans (USA) on March 26, 1988 in Orlando, USA.
CR: 16:01.02 swum by Hannah Stockbauer (Germany) on July 28, 2001 in Fukuoka, Japan

Results

Final

Preliminaries

References

World Aquatics Championships
Swimming at the 2003 World Aquatics Championships
2003 in women's swimming